Mini Dome can refer to many dome stadiums or covered fields, including:

 ETSU/Mountain States Health Alliance Athletic Center in Johnson City, Tennessee
 Holt Arena in Idaho